Maybelyn dela Cruz-Fernandez (born December 20, 1982) is a Filipino actress and politician based in the Philippines. She was former child star and popularly known as the daughter of Nova Villa in Home Along Da Riles, a comedy series that aired on ABS-CBN. She served as city councilor of Dagupan from 2010 to 2019.

Career
Dela Cruz started as child star in Ang TV of ABS-CBN. She worked with the late Dolphy for eight years when she was cast as his 10-year-old niece in the television sitcom Home Along Da Riles from 1992.

She appeared in GMA's Impostora (2007) starring Sunshine Dizon and Iza Calzado, and Babangon Ako't Dudurugin Kita (2008) starring Yasmien Kurdi and Dina Bonnevie. She did also Gaano Kadalas Ang Minsan? (2008) starring Marvin Agustin, Camille Prats and Diana Zubiri, and Dapat Ka Bang Mahalin? (2009) starring Aljur Abrenica and Kris Bernal, showed in GMA-7. In 2009, she played the role originally played by Beth Bautista, as Choleng, in the TV remake of the 1985 film Tinik Sa Dibdib with Nadine Samonte.

She performed also in theater the role of Maria Clara in Noli Me Tangere.

Personal life
She is married to Dagupan councilor Michael Fernandez on January 20, 2008. The two met in 2005, during the National Assembly of the Philippine Councilors League (PCL). She was elected as number one city councilor in Dagupan in 2010. She is an active member of the Philippine National Red Cross (PNRC) for a long time, where she served as a member of the board of PNRC-Pangasinan.

Her lawyer father served as a three termer councilor of Las Piñas.

Maybelyn quits showbiz in 2015. Her last project was a drama anthology "Karelasyon" which formerly hosted by Carla Abellana and was previously aired on GMA Channel 7.

She returned to showbiz in 2021 in the anthology series Wish Ko Lang! as a guest role, and had her first regular role as Cara, the main villain and wicked arch-enemy of Hope/Bianca in Unica Hija.

Filmography

Television
Unica Hija (2022–2023)
Karelasyon (2015)
Sabado Badoo (2015)
Magpakailanman: Cain At Abel (2014)
Anna KareNina (TV series) (2013)
Hindi Ka Na Mag-iisa (TV series) (2012)
Amaya (2011–2012)
My Lover, My Wife (TV series) (2011)
Bantatay (2010)
The Last Prince (TV series) (2010)
Tinik Sa Dibdib (TV series) (2009–2010)
Dapat Ka Bang Mahalin? (TV series) (2009)
Gaano Kadalas ang Minsan (2008)
Babangon Ako't Dudurugin Kita  (2008)
Impostora (2007)
Quizon Avenue (ABS-CBN 2, 2005)
Magpakailanman - Bernabe Dodong Pasagad Story (2005)
Home Along Da Airport (ABS-CBN 2, 2002-2003)
Kahit Kailan (TV series) (2002-2003)
Kung Mawawala Ka (TV series) (2002-2003)
Click (1999–2002)
Maynila (1999)
Sing Galing (TV5, 
Lovingly Yours (GMA 7, 1996)
T.G.I.S. (TV series) (1995-1999)
MMK: Maalaala Mo Kaya (ABS-CBN 2, 1992–2015)
Home Along Da Riles (TV sitcom) (1992-2003)
Ang TV (1992-1997)

Movies

Pitong Tagpo (2007)
Kilig... Pintig... Yanig (2004)
Bahay Ni Lola (2001)
Home Along Da Riles 2 (1997)
TGIS The Movie (1996)
Megamol (1994)
Home Along Da Riles Da Movie (1993)

References

External links

Living people
1982 births
Filipino actor-politicians
Filipino women comedians
Liberal Party (Philippines) politicians
People from Dagupan
People from Las Piñas
Actresses from Metro Manila
Filipino city and municipal councilors
ABS-CBN personalities
Star Magic
GMA Network personalities